Kazimierz Fajans (Kasimir Fajans in many American publications; 27 May 1887 – 18 May 1975) was a Polish American physical chemist of Polish-Jewish origin, a pioneer in the science of radioactivity and the co-discoverer of chemical element protactinium.

Education and career
He was born May 27, 1887, in Warsaw, Congress Poland, to a family of Jewish background. After he had completed secondary school in Warsaw (1904), he started studying chemistry in Germany, at first at the University in Leipzig, and then in Heidelberg and Zürich. In 1909 he was awarded a PhD degree for his research into the stereoselective synthesis of chiral compounds.

In 1910 Fajans took a job at the laboratory of Ernest Rutherford in Manchester, where the nucleus was discovered.  He then returned to Germany, where he took the position of an assistant and later became the assistant professor at the Technical University of Karlsruhe. He researched into radioactivity. In 1917 he took over the Faculty of Physical Chemistry at Munich University, and in 1932 became the Head of the Institute of Physical Chemistry established by the Rockefeller Foundation. In 1935 he left Germany due to the escalation of Nazi persecution. He stayed for a while in Cambridge and next moved to Ann Arbor, Michigan in the United States, where he joined the Faculty of the University of Michigan where he continued to work until the end of his life. In 1959, he became an honorary member of the Polish Chemical Society.

He retired at age of seventy but never stopped working. He died May 18, 1975 in Ann Arbor.

Scientific work

When Fajans worked at the laboratory of Ernest Rutherford (with Henry G. Moseley) he was researching properties of the radioactive rows. He identified the half-lives of the uranium-actinium row and thorium nuclides. 
He discovered the phenomenon of the electrochemical branching of the radioactive rows. Afterwards Fajans was working on the electrochemical properties of elements as a result of the radioactive changes, and he formulated the law of the radioactive shifts which was later named the radioactive displacement law of Fajans and Soddy (Frederick Soddy received the Nobel Prize in chemistry in 1921 for his isotopic research). In 1913, together with Oswald Helmuth Göhring, he discovered the radionuclide of a new element, which was later called protactinium. Fajans and Otto Hahn were the discoverers of the formula that defined the conditions of the precipitation and absorption of radioactive substances. It is very significant in the context of radiochemical methods of separating and cleaning radioactive substances found in the smallest number.

In 1919, Fajans started researching the structure of particle and crystal by the thermochemical and refractometrical methods. 
The co-relation of Born, Fajans and Haber is one of the basic thermochemical rule. On the basis of his research data Fajans formulated the essential conclusions concerning chemical bonding strength and deformation of ions and particles, such as heat of ion hydration, refraction measurements and the heat of sublimation. In 1923 he formulated Fajans' rules of inorganic chemistry, which are used to predict whether a chemical bond will be covalent or ionic.

In the United States he researched nuclear reactions using a cyclotron and discovered a radioactive lead isotope with Voigt, and a new rhenium isotope with Sullivan. He developed the quanticule theory which explained the rule of chemical bondings through electrostatic impacts between quanticules and nuclear cores. He was a member of the Polish Institute of Arts and Sciences in America and of many societies and academies.

Bibliography
1913 - Radioactive Transformations and the Periodic System of the Elements
1941 - Artificial radioactive isotopes of Thallium, Lead and Bismuth
1947 - Application of the resonance theory to the structure of the water molecule
1948 - Electronic structure of molecules

See also 
 Radioactivity

References

Further reading

External links
Annotated Bibliography for Kazimierz Fajans from the Alsos Digital Library for Nuclear Issues

1887 births
1975 deaths
20th-century Polish physicists
Discoverers of chemical elements
University of Michigan faculty
Corresponding Members of the Russian Academy of Sciences (1917–1925)
Corresponding Members of the USSR Academy of Sciences
Foreign Members of the USSR Academy of Sciences
19th-century Polish Jews
Jewish American scientists
Jewish physicists
Fellows of the American Physical Society
Emigrants from Congress Poland to Germany
German emigrants to the United States